Hidayat al-Mutaallemin fi al-Ṭibb (A Guide to Medical Learners) is a medical guide written in Persian. The author is Abu Bakr Rabee Ibn Ahmad Al-Akhawyni Bokhari (also spelled Al-Akhawayni Bukhari, ?-983 AD).

It was one of the first Iranian Islamic  medical textbooks. The book contains articles about the elements, temperaments, humors, hygiene, anatomy, physiology, pathology, signs and symptoms of diseases and  treatment of many diseases,.

Akhawayni Bukhari  was the first  physician  in  Iran and Near East that  provided  a  practical classification  for mental disorders. The description of Akhawayni from clinical signs and  symptoms  of patients that suffer from melancholia  is attractive in history of  psychology.

Several libraries and cultural institutes have copies of the book, including the Bodleian Library in England, the library at Fatih, Istanbul, and the Malek National Library and Museum in Tehran.

View on Melancholia
Akhawayni is well known for his treatment of patients with mental disorders  and he describes a number of these disorders, such as Mania, Dementia, Conversion Disorder and Melancholia, in his book. Al-Akhawayni describes Melancholia as a chronic illness and relates it to brain, which is one of the main aspects of his view on Melancholia. He describes Melancholia's initial clinical manifestations as "suffering from an unexplained fear, inability to answer questions or providing false answers, self-laughing and self-crying and speaking meaninglessly, yet with no fever"

He further categorizes Melancholia patients into three types: 
 first group suffered from significant weight loss in head and neck region
 second group suffered from a significant systemic weight loss and 
 third group actually gained a significant increase in appetite 
He then described different symptoms and different treatments in each group.

For treatment of this disease, he advised his own treatments in addition to those of his predecessors. These treatments consisted mainly of medicinal herbs and natural fats.

References

External links
 

Medical works of medieval Iran
Medical works of the medieval Islamic world
Persian encyclopedias
Persian literature
Works about the history of medicine
Iranian literature
Iranian books
10th-century books
Encyclopedias of medicine
Psychology in the medieval Islamic world